Aqua Aqua is a puzzle video game developed by Zed Two, the studio of Ste and John Pickford, for the PlayStation 2. It was published in July 2000 by Imagineer in Japan, and in late 2000 by The 3DO Company in North America and SCi Games in Europe. It is the sequel to Wetrix (1998) and has very similar gameplay; the player, on a landscape, uses Uppers to create walls for enclosures that hold flying water bubbles, contending with hazards like rainstorms, bombs, and ice cubes in the process.

Imagineer commissioned a sequel to Wetrix following the predecessor's critical and commercial success. It was released in 2000 in Europe, North America and Japan as the third PlayStation 2 puzzle game after Fantavision and Super Bust-A-Move, selling 70,000+ copies in the West and 15,000+ in Japan. Aqua Aqua was generally well-received by professional critics for its addictiveness, graphics and sound. Criticism was targeted at the steep learning curve, the short length of the Story mode, the fixed camera and loose controls causing imprecise piece placements, and how little advantage was taken with the console's hardware.

Game modes 

Aqua Aquas gameplay remains largely unchanged from Wetrix (1998). Described by Electronic Gaming Monthlys Chris Johnston as a combination of Tetris and Civilization, it is a 3D isometric puzzle game where the player builds paddocks on land to prevent falling water bubbles from dripping off the landscape. The enclosures are created by dropping L-shaped, T-shaped and square pieces that raise a part of the landscape named Uppers; there are also Downers that do the opposite, decrease the height of a wall. Fireballs help in the player's goal, in that they evaporate water, and points are earned from it depending on how much water is evaporated. However, there are also hazards such as bombs that create holes on the ground, ice cubes that freeze water, rainstorms that occur in the later stages, and earthquakes triggered when a wall is too high that ruin nearly all of the architecture. The amount of water dripped off the land is showcased by a meter, which the game ends once its full.

Modes include a single-game Quick mode, an eight-level Tutorial, a two-player Versus mode and a four-level Story Mode; the Tutorial must be completed to unlock the Story and Versus modes. In Story, there are three bosses, who attack by ruining the player's structure and must be beaten by achieving a certain score within a limited period. A new feature is a grid for where the Uppers and Downers will land, in addition to the shadows.

Development and release 
Aqua Aquas predecessor, Wetrix, was developed by Zed Two, a small studio owned by Ste and John Pickford. It was conceived out of a water effects demo done for another one of their own games, Vampire Circus, which became Taz Express (2000). Wetrix and Taz Express were published by Ocean Software out of a two-game deal signed a week before the publisher merged with Infogrames. The game's Nintendo 64 release sold 105,000+ copies in the west and 12,000+ in Japan. Additionally, Wetrix was critically acclaimed for its originality in the puzzle game genre, scoring 8/8/8/7 in Famitsu, the magazine's highest for a Western title in years.

The critical and commercial success motivated Japanese company Imagineer, who developed Wetrixs Game Boy Color port, to commission Zed Two to create a sequel for the PlayStation 2. The Pickfords had several ideas. One major plan was to allow the player to expand the width of the land with the falling Uppers, and Imagineer thought of adding a "weird old man". Ultimately, the only major addition was cute-looking characters, done to make the product more appealing to Japanese audiences. Contrary to fan rumors that PlayStation 2 development kits were already in the United States by mid-1999, none had been sent by Sony to companies outside of Japan until October 1999. This meant some Zed Two staff flew to Japan to develop Aqua Aqua.

On June 25, 1999, IGN revealed Zed Two was developing a sequel to Wetrix, not yet named, for the upcoming PlayStation 2 console. On August 27, Zed Two revealed they planned to release it by March 2000. This had been moved to summer 2000 by the time the sequel was presented at the 2000 Tokyo Game Show, where its name, Aqua Aqua, was revealed. Timothy Horst reported that the demo at the Tokyo Game Show appeared to be "pretty much done", and that the game would basically be its predecessor with improved visuals. IGN revealed the game's four modes, as well as the July 2000 Japan date, on April 20, 2000. The 3DO Company published Aqua Aqua in North America on December 30, 2000, while SCi Games published it in Europe in November 2000. It was the third puzzle game released for the console after Fantavision and Super Bust-A-Move. Aqua Aqua sold 15,000+ units in Japan, and 70,000+ in the West, numbers GamesTM attributed to its reputation as a PlayStation 2 launch title.

Reception 

Reviews of Aqua Aqua were generally positive. Containing gameplay and graphics identical to Wetrix, it received the same praises and critiques. 
"Aqua Aqua has its problems, but it's still the best puzzle game yet to grace the PlayStation 2,"  wrote GameSpots Shane Satterfield. In the mind of David Zdyrko of IGN, Aqua Aqua "takes the basic gameplay elements that made its prequel so well liked and has added a lot of neat new features and play mechanics". 

Aqua Aqua was highlighted for its addictive quality. Its difficulty and fast pace was also of frequent note, as well as the steep learning curve that critics suggested could turn off those not very experienced in puzzle games; Alex of Video Games reported he had to start over the first level several times. Jay Semerad of AllGame praised the difficulty and how the game rewarded players, such as with Lake Mates and rainbows. Much criticism was directed at how needlessly tricky it was to place pieces accurately, caused by loose control and a fixed, nonadjustable camera angle. Allgames Jay Semerad lamented that the directional pad controls the falling pieces (unlike Wetrix which was controlled with a more versatile analog stick), and a piece can jump from one side of the screen to another with one small tap. Official U.S. PlayStation Magazines Joe Rybicki dismissed the rules as needlessly complicated, and panned the "slippery" control and unclear perspective for slowing down the pace, "forcing you to either drop blocks haphazardly or painstakingly map out each move". The camera angle also made looking for water leaks tedious, wrote Satterfield.

Although praised by Zdyrko as a new edition to the Wetrix series, the Story Mode was generally criticized for being too short, reviewers reported beating it within a few hours. Official UK PlayStation 2 Magazines Louis Wells criticized the "seemingly unobtainable points needed to stop a boss". The Versus mode was lauded by several reviewers for its addictiveness and challenge, while criticized by Satterfield and The Electric Playground writer Jules Grant for a lack of interaction between players. Chris Johnston of Electronic Gaming Monthly also recommended that there should have been a Versus mode with a computer player. Next Generation critic Kevin Toyama berated the requirement of having to save progress on the tutorial stage just to play the actual game modes.

The graphics was positively-commented on, although criticized for taking little advantage of console space. Zdyrko was one of the critics to argue this; although highlighting the "nice special effects and cool lighting", he found the problem prevalent in the object and character models being "plain and unimaginative". Satterfield also found the character models low-quality, analogizing them as done by a beginner 3D modeling student. However, he was more forgiving towards the graphics in general, saying that although not the best for the PlayStation 2, they served their function for a puzzle game, as doing anything more spectacular would only distract the player. He praised the color palette as "bright and colorful, and the effects for placing pieces are snazzy for the first few hours". GameRevolution journalist G-Wok appreciated the graphics as "clean and colorful", and Official UK PlayStation 2 Magazines Louis Wells enjoyed the cute character design, "beautifully rendered" land, and water effects. The Electric Playground writer Jules Grant condemned the cutscenes as "too-cute". The game's ambient techno new age soundtrack was well-received, although critiqued for being repetitive. Zdyrko called the voice acting cute and the sound effects "very crisp and clear", and Satterfield wrote "the sound effects aid in creating a chaotic atmosphere but do little else."

Notes

References

External links
 

2000 video games
Falling block puzzle games
Imagineer games
PlayStation 2 games
PlayStation 2-only games
Video game sequels
Video games developed in the United Kingdom
RenderWare games